Săiți is a village in Căușeni District, Moldova.

Notable people
 Sergiu Musteață

References

Villages of Căușeni District